The Casino - My Game, My Rules is a 2020 Hindi language streaming television series directed by Hardik Gajjar and Tushar Bhatia. It is written by Girish Dhamija and Deepak Pachory whereas produced by KVB Entertainment Gajjar Parth and Richa Amod Sachan. The series marks the digital debut of actors Karanvir Bohra and Mandana Karimi. The series started streaming on ZEE5 from 12 June 2020.

Cast

Main 
 Karanvir Bohra as Vikramaditya (Vicky) Singh Marwah
 Sudhanshu Pandey as Shailendra Singh Marwah 
 Aindrita Ray as Camilla Khurana
 Mandana Karimi as Rehana Chaudhari

Recurring 
 Pooja Banerjee as Riya Marwah
 Gungun Uprari as Roop Shailendra Singh Marwah
 Rajesh Khera as Deshmukh
 Mantra as Rinzin
 Micky Makhija as Commissioner

Production

Filming 
Principal photography commenced in Nepal with the lead actors Karanvir Bohra and Mandana Karimi, and they had been spotted shooting on Wednesday 22 January 2020.

Marketing and release

Promotion 
The official trailer of the webseries was launched on 12 May 2020 by ZEE5 on YouTube.

Release 
The Casino - My Game, My Rules was available for streaming on ZEE5 from 12 June 2020.

Episodes

Soundtrack

References

External links 
 
 The Casino at ZEE5

Indian web series
Thriller web series